Libellula semifasciata, the painted skimmer, is an uncommon eastern North American skimmer dragonfly, found from New Brunswick, Canada as far south as Texas and Florida.

Each wing is amber coloured at the base and wing tip and has several brown spots. The abdomen has a lateral strip that is white anteriorly and yellow posteriorly.

References

External links

Libellulidae
Odonata of North America
Insects of the United States
Insects of Canada
Insects described in 1839